Seed blanking is a plant disease injury causing the seed producing anatomy to contain no seeds despite otherwise normal development. This term is used to contrast with other causes of seed production failure, including but not limited to earlier or more widespread damage to the plant. For one example, wheat blast causes widespread seed blanking.

References

Plant diseases
Seeds
Plants